"That Old Song" is a 1981 song recorded by American R&B vocalist and songwriter Ray Parker Jr., along with his group, Raydio. It was the third of four single releases from their 1981 album, A Woman Needs Love, the last Parker recorded with Raydio. It was the second biggest hit from the album, after "A Woman Needs Love (Just Like You Do)."

Chart history
"That Old Song" reached number 21 on the Hot 100 and peaked at number seven on the Adult Contemporary chart.

References

External links
Lyrics of this song
  

1981 singles
Ray Parker Jr. songs
Songs written by Ray Parker Jr.
1981 songs
Arista Records singles
Songs about music